Deplanchea tetraphylla is a species of tropical rainforest tree, commonly known as golden bouquet tree, wallaby wireless tree or yellow pagoda flower tree, constituting part of the plant family Bignoniaceae.

It grows naturally in New Guinea, Aru Islands, Cape York Peninsula and the Wet Tropics of Queensland, north eastern Australia.

Atop the branches, mature trees have spectacular large bouquets of many yellow flowers, hence popularly planted in wet–tropical Australian horticulture.

References

External links

Map of recorded sitings of Deplanchea tetraphylla at the Australasian Virtual Herbarium
 Deplanchea tetraphylla photographs in Flickr

Bignoniaceae
Taxa named by Robert Brown (botanist, born 1773)
Flora of Queensland
Flora of New Guinea